The 1988 Intercontinental Final was the fourteenth running of the Intercontinental Final as part of the qualification for the 1988 Speedway World Championship. The 1988 Final was run on 6 August at the Vetlanda Speedway in Vetlanda, Sweden, and was the last qualifying stage for riders from Scandinavia, the USA and from the Commonwealth nations for the World Final to be held at the Speedway Center in Vojens, Denmark.

Intercontinental Final
 6 August
  Vetlanda, Vetlanda Speedway
 Qualification: Top 11 plus 1 reserve to the World Final in Vojens, Denmark

References

See also
 Motorcycle Speedway

1988
World Individual
International sports competitions hosted by Sweden